Act of Union may refer to:

In Great Britain and Ireland
 Laws in Wales Acts 1535 and 1542, passed during the reign of King Henry VIII to make Wales a part of the Kingdom of England, often referred to in the plural as the "Acts of Union" (Welsh, Y Deddfau Uno)
 Tender of Union (Act of Union 1652), Tender of Union uniting Scotland with the Commonwealth of England
 Acts of Union 1707, passed by both the Parliament of England and the Parliament of Scotland to form the Kingdom of Great Britain
 Acts of Union 1800, passed by both the Parliament of Great Britain and the Parliament of Ireland to form the United Kingdom of Great Britain and Ireland

In the British Empire
 Act of Union 1840, passed by the Parliament of the UK, joining Upper Canada and Lower Canada to form the Province of Canada
 South Africa Act 1909, passed by the Parliament of the UK creating the Union of South Africa, sometimes referred to as the Act of Union

In Scandinavia
 Riksakten (Act of Union 1814), the Union between Sweden and Norway, forming a personal union between Sweden and Norway
 Danish–Icelandic Act of Union, a 1918 union granting independence to Iceland

Other uses
 Act of Union, a poem by Seamus Heaney, written in 1975
 Bull of Union with the Greeks (Laetentur Caeli), a 1439 papal bull sometimes referred to as the Act of Union